Tiazofurin is a drug which acts as an inhibitor of the enzyme IMP dehydrogenase. Tiazofurin and its analogues were under investigation for potential use in the treatment of cancer, though side effects such as pleuropericarditis and a flu-like syndrome precluded further development. They also show antiviral effects and may be reevaluated as potential options in the treatment of newly emerging viral diseases.

References

Carboxamides
Ribosides
Thiazoles
Experimental cancer drugs